Billy Walters (born 9 February 1994) is an Australian professional rugby league footballer who plays as a  or  for the Brisbane Broncos  in the NRL.

He previously played for the Melbourne Storm and Wests Tigers in the National Rugby League.

Background
Walters was born in Brisbane, Queensland, Australia.

At age four, Walters lost his mother Kim to breast cancer. Walters is the son of the Brisbane Broncos and former Maroons coach Kevin Walters and nephew of former Maroons players Kerrod Walters and Steve Walters.
He attended Marist College Ashgrove, Brisbane, from which he graduated in 2011.

Playing career

2019
Walters made his NRL debut in round 16 for the Melbourne Storm against  St. George Illawarra. He had his jersey (cap 196) presented to him by his father and former Melbourne Storm assistant coach Kevin Walters. 

On 12 September, Walters signed a two-year deal with the Wests Tigers that would take him to the end of 2021.

2020
In round 1 of the 2020 NRL season, Walters made his club debut for the Wests Tigers, starting the match at hooker. In round 10 of the 2020 NRL season, Walters scored his first try in the top grade as Wests Tigers defeated Brisbane 48-0 at Leichhardt Oval.

2021
On 6 September, Walters was one of five players who were released by the Wests Tigers club. He was subsequently signed by the Brisbane Broncos to play under the coaching of his father, Kevin, in 2022.

2022
Walters played 23 games for Brisbane in the 2022 NRL season as the club finished 9th on the table and missed the finals.

References

External links

Wests Tigers profile
Melbourne Storm profile

1994 births
Living people
Australian rugby league players
Brisbane Broncos players
Melbourne Storm players
Rugby league five-eighths
Rugby league players from Brisbane
Billy
Wests Tigers players